InterSystems Corporation is a privately held vendor of software systems and technology for high-performance database management, rapid application development, integration, and healthcare information systems. The vendor's products include InterSystems IRIS Data Platform, Caché Database Management System, the InterSystems Ensemble integration platform, the HealthShare healthcare informatics platform and TrakCare healthcare information system, which is sold outside the United States.

InterSystems is based in Cambridge, Massachusetts. The company's revenue was $727 million in 2019.

History 

InterSystems was founded in 1978 by Phillip T. (Terry) Ragon, its current CEO. The firm was one of the vendors of M-technology (aka MUMPS) systems, with a product called ISM-11 (an DSM-11 clone) for the DEC PDP-11 . Over the years, it acquired several other MUMPS implementations: DTM from Data Tree (1993); DSM from Digital (1995); and MSM from Micronetics (1998); making InterSystems the dominant M technology vendor.

The firm eventually started combining features from these products into one they called OpenM, then consolidated the technologies into a product, Caché, in 1997. At that time they stopped new development for all of their legacy M-based products (although the company still supports existing customers). They launched Ensemble, an integration platform, in 2003 and HealthShare, a scalable health informatics platform, in 2006. In 2007, InterSystems purchased TrakHealth, an Australian vendor of TrakCare, a modular healthcare information system based on InterSystems technology. In May 2011, the firm launched Globals as a free database based on the multi-dimensional array storage technology used in Caché. In September 2011, InterSystems purchased Siemens Health Services (SHS) France from its parent company, Siemens.  In September 2017, InterSystems announced InterSystems IRIS Data Platform, which, the company said, combines database management capabilities together with interoperability and analytics, as well as technologies such as sharding for performance.

Products 

The company's products include the following: 

 InterSystems IRIS data platform, a hybrid multi-model database management system for real-time transactions and analytics that is available as a private or public fully managed cloud platform.
 InterSystems IRIS for Health, a data platform that supports healthcare messaging protocols such as FHIR, HL7, and IHE.
 HealthShare, a healthcare informatics platform that supports the creation of and secure access to unified care records.
 TrakCare, a web-based healthcare information system, available outside the U.S.
 InterSystems Caché, a multi-model database management systems and application server. A MUMPS Server with SQL-Overlay and featured developer tools
 InterSystems Ensemble, a rapid integration and application development platform. 
In 2020, InterSystems was named a Visionary in Gartner’s Magic Quadrant for cloud database management systems for its InterSystems IRIS technology.

Customers 
Epic Systems, a privately held health records vendor, is the company’s largest customer and has been using InterSystems technology for more than 40 years. Epic originally built its electronic medical records software on InterSystems Caché but used InterSystems IRIS data platform as the foundation of a new release of its software launched in 2020. As of 2015, Epic EMR software held the records of 54% of all U.S. patients and 2.5% of patients globally.

In July 2020, the U.S. Department of Veterans Affairs launched a HealthShare-based platform called InterSystems Veterans Data Integration and Federation Enterprise Platform (VDIF EP) for developing longitudinal patient records. VDIF EP enables care providers both within and outside the Veterans Health Administration to access veterans’ patient records. The VA has used VDIF EP for tracking COVID-19 infections among veterans and VA medical personnel and for managing resource deployment across 172 VA medical centers and more than 1,000 outpatient clinics. 

Other major InterSystems customers include Credit Suisse, whose trading platform uses InterSystems Caché; the European Space Agency, which used InterSystems Caché for its Gaia mission to create a 3D map of the Milky Way; Partners Healthcare, which built its electronic health records system using InterSystems Caché and Ensemble; and the national health services of England, Scotland, and Wales, which use TrakCare for sharing patient health information and e-prescribing. 3M, BNY Mellon, Canon, Franklin Templeton, HSBC, MSC Mediterranean Shipping Company, Olympus, Ricoh, SPAR, and TD Ameritrade also use InterSystems software.

Microsoft dispute 

On August 14, 2008, the Boston Globe reported that InterSystems was filing a lawsuit against Microsoft Corporation, another tenant in its Cambridge, Mass., headquarters, seeking to prevent Microsoft from expanding in the building. InterSystems also filed a lawsuit against building owner Equity Office Partners, a subsidiary of the Blackstone Group, "contending that it conspired with Microsoft to lease space that InterSystems had rights to, and sought to drive up rents in the process".

In 2010, CEO Terry Ragon led a coalition in Cambridge called Save Our Skyline to protest a city zoning change that would have allowed more signs on top of commercial buildings, partly in response to Microsoft's desire to put a sign on top of their shared building.

Both disputes were eventually settled, and Microsoft and InterSystems agreed to both put low signs only in front of the building at street level.

References

External links 
 InterSystems website

Software companies based in Massachusetts
Companies based in Cambridge, Massachusetts
Privately held companies based in Massachusetts
Relational database management systems
Object-oriented database management systems
Proprietary software
Electronic health record software companies
Software companies of the United States